José Urueta (born 7 December 1955) is a Mexican former backstroke swimmer. He competed at the 1972 Summer Olympics and the 1976 Summer Olympics.

References

External links
 

1955 births
Living people
Mexican male backstroke swimmers
Olympic swimmers of Mexico
Swimmers at the 1972 Summer Olympics
Swimmers at the 1976 Summer Olympics
Pan American Games competitors for Mexico
Swimmers at the 1971 Pan American Games
Swimmers at the 1979 Pan American Games
Place of birth missing (living people)